Florence Guggenheim-Grünberg (August 30, 1898 Berne, Switzerland-February 14, 1989 Zürich) was a historian and pharmacist.

Biography
Guggenheim-Grünberg was active in Swiss Jewish organizations, both nationally and internationally, in the 1930s and 40s.  She was president of the Juedische Vereinigung in Zurich in 1950 and the editor of Beiträge zur Geschichte und Volkskunde der Juden in der Schweiz.

References

External links
MIKHL HERZOG AND FLORENCE GUGGENHEIM-GRÜNBERG ON WESTERN YIDDISH (1965)

Swiss women historians
Swiss pharmacists
1898 births
1989 deaths